Imam Quli Khan may refer to:
Imam Quli Khan of Bukhara (1582–1644)
Imam Quli Khan (Safavid governor) (died 1632)
David II of Kakheti (1678–1722)

See also
 Imam Quli (given name)
 Khan (title)